Polyipnus danae is a species of ray-finned fish in the genus Polyipnus. It is found in the South China Sea in waters from 0 - 700 meters.

References

Sternoptychidae
Fish described in 1994